"Do not go gentle into that good night" is a poem in the form of a villanelle by Welsh poet Dylan Thomas (1914–1953), and is one of his best-known works. Though first published in the journal Botteghe Oscure in 1951, the poem was written in 1947 while Thomas visited Florence with his family. Subsequent publication, along with other Thomas works, include In Country Sleep, And Other Poems (New Directions, 1952) and Collected Poems, 1934–1952 (Dent, 1952).

It has been suggested that the poem was written for Thomas's dying father, although he did not die until just before Christmas in 1952. It has no title other than its first line, "Do not go gentle into that good night", a line that appears as a refrain throughout the poem along with its other refrain, "Rage, rage against the dying of the light".

Form 
The villanelle consists of five stanzas of three lines (tercets) followed by a single stanza of four lines (a quatrain) for a total of nineteen lines. It is structured by two repeating rhymes and two refrains: the first line of the first stanza serves as the last line of the second and fourth stanzas, and the third line of the first stanza serves as the last line of the third and fifth stanzas. The rhyme-and-refrain pattern of "Do not go gentle into that good night" can be schematized, as shown below.

Analysis

Summary 
In the first stanza of "Do Not Go Gentle", the speaker encourages his father not to "go gentle into that good night" but rather to "rage, rage against the dying of the light." Then, in the subsequent stanzas, he proceeds to list all manner of men, using terms such as "wise", "good", "wild", and "grave" as descriptors, who, in their own respective ways, embody the refrains of the poem. In the final stanza, the speaker implores his father, whom he observes upon a "sad height", begging him to "Curse, bless, me now with your fierce tears", and reiterates the refrains once more.

Literary opinion 
While this poem has inspired a significant amount of unique discussion and analysis from such critics as Seamus Heaney, Jonathan Westphal, and Walford Davies, some interpretations of the poem's meaning is under general consensus. "This is obviously a threshold poem about death", Heaney writes, and Westphal agrees, noting that "[Thomas] is advocating active resistance to death." Heaney thinks that the poem's structure as a villanelle "[turns] upon itself, advancing and retiring to and from a resolution" in order to convey "a vivid figure of the union of opposites" that encapsulates "the balance between natural grief and the recognition of necessity which pervades the poem as a whole."  

Westphal writes that the "sad height" Thomas refers to in line 16 is "of particular importance and interest in appreciating the poem as a whole." He asserts that it was not a literal structure, such as a bier, not only because of the literal fact that Thomas' father died after the poem's publication, but also because "it would be pointless for Thomas to advise his father not to 'go gentle' if he were already dead ..." Instead, he thinks that Thomas' phrase refers to "a metaphorical plateau of aloneness and loneliness before death". In his 2014 "Writers of Wales" biography of Thomas, Davies disagrees, instead believing that the imagery is more allusive in nature, and that it "clearly evokes both King Lear on the heath and Gloucester thinking he is at Dover Cliff."

Use and references in other works

"Do not go gentle into that good night" was used as the text for Igor Stravinsky's In Memoriam Dylan Thomas (Dirge-Canons and Song) for tenor and chamber ensemble, which was written soon after Thomas's death and first performed in 1954. It is the subject of a 1979 tone poem for wind ensemble by Elliot del Borgo entitled Do Not Go Gentle into That Good Night, and was set to orchestral music by John Cale for his 1989 album Words for the Dying. Vincent Persichetti wrote a work for organ pedals alone after the poem called Do Not Go Gentle; it was premiered by Leonard Raver at Alice Tully Hall on Feb 7, 1976. In 1999 Janet Owen Thomas set the poem to music in the 2nd (final) movement of her work Under the Skin.

The title of George R.R. Martin's sci-fi novel  Dying Of the Light, published in 1977, is based on one of the two refrains present in "Do not go gentle into that good night". The book deals with topics of the resistance and acceptance of death, on a planetary scale. In the book, the planet is slowly on course out of the region of its neighboring stars, experiencing both literal and metaphorical "dying of the light".

The ninth book in the Skulduggery Pleasant series by Irish Author Derek Landy is titled ‘The dying of the light’. The opening passage of the book features an extract from the poem.

The poem is read in full by Iggy Pop as the ninth track on his 2019 album Free. A rock version by Billy Green was featured in the soundtrack of the Australian biker film Stone (1974).

The poem or snippets from or references to it turn up from time to time in films, including Independence Day (1996), where the American President vows to fight the invaders with "We will not go quietly into the night"), Back to School (1986), Dangerous minds (1995) where Michelle Pheiffer's character uses the poem for a class contest (Dylan Thomas v Bob Dylan contest) and Interstellar (2014) where the poem is used repeatedly by Michael Caine's character Professor John Brand, as well as by several other supporting characters.

The poem has also been referenced in other media: "Do not go gentle into that good night" was the inspiration for three paintings by Swansea-born painter and print-maker Ceri Richards, who drew them in 1954, 1956, and 1965 respectively.

Chinese law professor Xu Zhangrun has used it in his widely recognized 2020 text of government critique.

The novel Solenoid (2015), by Romanian writer Mircea Cartarescu mentions the poem as the most important protest against death.

References

External links 
Hear Dylan Thomas Recite His Classic Poem, “Do Not Go Gentle Into That Good Night” (posted at Open Culture, September 19, 2018).

Anglo-Welsh literature
1951 poems
Poetry by Dylan Thomas
Works originally published in Italian magazines
Works originally published in literary magazines
Poems about death
Quotations from literature
1950s neologisms
Modernist poems
Redirects from opening lines